Assem Omar Jarrah (‘Āsim Jarrāḥ; born 1962 in Lebanon) is conflictingly reported as the distant cousin of Ziad Jarrah, one of the hijackers of the September 11 attacks. His work permit was found in the smouldering remains of United Airlines Flight 93 along with Ziad's charred passport. It was later proved that Assem was not involved in this situation.

Jarrah enrolled in Hamburg University in 1982. 

In autumn 1985 he signed up for pharmacy in University of Greifswald (East Germany) and graduated in 1990. Later he became a manager with the Lebanon division of Fresenius (company).  His work included the sale of chemical and medical equipment to national governments. Mainly focusing on kidney dialysis equipments.

References

1962 births
Living people
Terrorism in Lebanon